Senator York may refer to:

Alexander M. York (1838–1928), Kansas State Senate
Marvin York (born 1932), Oklahoma State Senate
Myrth York (born 1946), Rhode Island State Senate
Tyre York (1836–1916), North Carolina State Senate